Soo Hong is an American politician and lawyer who is a member of the Georgia House of Representatives, representing the 103rd district. Her district comprises parts of Gwinett County and Hall County. In addition to serving in the General Assembly, Hong is also a partner at a law firm. She is the first woman of Korean descent to serve in the House.

Tenure 
At the beginning of Hong's first term, Governor Brian Kemp named her one of his legislative floor leaders in the House.

Elections 
Hong ran in the 2020 Georgia House of Representatives election in the 102nd district and narrowly lost to Democratic incumbent Gregg Kennard.  Hong ran again in 2022, this time in the 103rd district following redistricting. Hong won the Republican primary unopposed, and in the general election, Hong defeated Democrat Ernie Anaya with 61% of the vote in the 2022 Georgia House of Representatives election.

Personal life 
Hong immigrated to the United States when she was 10 with her family from South Korea. She grew up in Cobb County and attended Georgia Tech and Mercer Law School.

References 

Living people
Republican Party members of the Georgia House of Representatives
21st-century American politicians
Year of birth missing (living people)
American people of South Korean descent
21st-century American women politicians
American women of Korean descent in politics
Asian-American people in Georgia (U.S. state) politics
South Korean emigrants to the United States
People from Seoul
People from Lawrenceville, Georgia